The 1891 San Diego mayoral election was held on April 7, 1891, to elect the mayor for San Diego. Matthew Sherman was elected Mayor with a majority of the votes.

Candidates
Matthew Sherman
J.W. Hughes

Campaign
Unlike the 1889 election, which was contested solely between Republicans on different tickets, the 1891 featured candidates from both the Republicans and the Democrats. Matthew Sherman was the candidate on the Republican side running against J.W. Hughes on the Democratic side.

On April 7, 1891, Sherman was elected mayor with 50.6 percent of the vote to Hughes's 49.4 percent.

Election results

References

1891
1891 California elections
1890s in San Diego
1891 United States mayoral elections
April 1891 events